Rházes Hernández López (1918–1991) was a Venezuelan composer and flutist born in Caracas June 30, 1918. He died in Caracas in 1991.

He composed several works for the piano, including Casualismo no. 6 (1984), and Prisma no. 1 (1979). Many of his works have been published by Ediciones del Congreso de la República, Instituto Latinoamericano de Investigaciones y Estudios Musicales "Vicente Emilio Sojo, Consejo Nacional de la Cultura."

López wrote at least two works for piano trio: Fragmentación cero and Tres Espacios Para Trio, a three-movement work. The latter was performed at the Third Music Festival of Caracas, Venezuela (1966) by violinist Jose Figueroa, cellist Adolfo Odnoposoff, and pianist Hector Tosar.

He composed at least one work for string orchestra, his Las torres desprevenidas (1990). The Library of Congress has copies of recordings of the Espacios and the Fragmentación, scores of the other works, and an authority record on file for this composer.

See also
Venezuela
Venezuelan music

References 
 - Jesús Ignacio Pérez Perazzo
Venezuela Symphony orchestra Magazine, 25th anniversary, 1955.

1918 births
1991 deaths
Musicians from Caracas
Venezuelan classical flautists
Venezuelan composers
Male composers
20th-century classical musicians
20th-century composers
20th-century male musicians
20th-century flautists